Nature Law or Break is a 2014 Chinese-Singaporean romantic comedy film directed by Li Jian and Qiu Zhongwei. It was released on November 7.

Cast
Eva Huang
Jia Yiping
Johnny Zhang
Liu Tianzuo
Lam Suet
Xiao Jian
Jiang Hongbo
Liu Huan
Yue Yueli
Li Jing

Reception
By November 7, the film had earned ¥1.03 million at the Chinese box office.

References

2014 romantic comedy films
Chinese romantic comedy films
Singaporean romantic comedy films